Economics & Sociology  is a peer-reviewed academic journal covering the socio-economic analysis of societies and economies, institutions, and organizations, social groups, networks and relationships. It was established in 2008 and is published by the Centre of Sociological Research (Poland). The editor-in-chief is Tomasz Bernat (Szczecin University).

Abstracting and indexing 
The journal is abstracted and indexed in:

External links 
 
  Centre of Sociological Research (Poland)

English-language journals
Quarterly journals
Sociology journals
Economics journals
Publications established in 2008